Domo Bolivariano de Barquisimeto, or simply Domo Bolivariano, is an indoor sporting arena that is located in Barquisimeto, Venezuela. The arena is named in honor of Simón Bolívar. The seating capacity of the arena is 10,000, and it is mainly used to host basketball games, as well as volleyball, boxing, and handball competitions.

History
Domo Bolivariano has been used as the home arena of the Venezuelan League professional basketball club, Guaros de Lara. The arena hosted the Grand Finals of the 2016 FIBA Americas League, and the 2017 FIBA Americas League.

References

External links
Guaros de Lara official website 

Domo
Boxing venues in Venezuela
Buildings and structures in Lara (state)
Indoor arenas in Venezuela
Handball venues in Venezuela
Sport in Barquisimeto
Domo